Ralf Ginsborg (11 April 1927 – 2 December 2006) was a Danish footballer who competed in the 1952 Summer Olympics.

References

1927 births
2006 deaths
Association football midfielders
Danish men's footballers
Hellerup IK players